Miss America 1935, the ninth Miss America pageant, was held at the Steel Pier in Atlantic City, New Jersey on Saturday, September 7, 1935, following a one-year hiatus. Upon arrival in Atlantic City, contestants were strongly encouraged to exhibit some form of talent during the pageant, which was a first for the pageant. Aside from Henrietta Leaver, Miss Pittsburgh winning the Miss America crown, entrants from Pennsylvania placed as three of the nine semi-finalists.

Judges included: Louis St. John (president of the Atlantic City Chamber of Commerce), Nils Granlund (of New York), Vincent Trotta (art director at Paramount Pictures), Elias Goldensky (photographer in Philadelphia), Walter Thornton, Willard Van der Veer (Academy Award winner for cinematography), and Giuseppe Donato (sculptor).

Results

Contestants

References

Secondary sources

External links
 Miss America official website

1935
1935 in the United States
1935 in New Jersey
September 1935 events
Events in Atlantic City, New Jersey